Due Process is a legal affairs television show which airs on NJTV (and its predecessor, NJN) and WNET.  First started in 1996, Due Process has been continually broadcasting about New Jersey's legal community. In its 19th season, Due Process is NJTV’s award-winning weekly series on law and justice issues. As part of public television, Due Process is dependent on outside support which it receives in major part from The Fund for New Jersey.

Hosted by Raymond M. Brown and Sandra King, Due Process is a half-hour show usually composed of a pre-recorded segment followed by a discussion with up to three guests. Recent issues include the confirmation of Supreme Court Justice Sonia Sotomayor, the Pew Study on Prisons, the nature of corruption in New Jersey, and the strides made towards diversity in the legal profession.

A typical season of Due Process is composed of 16 episodes, although the 13th season had 18 episodes. In 14 seasons, Due Process has produced more than 225 episodes, and won fourteen Emmys and received 75 Emmy nominations. It airs on NJTV on Sundays at 9:30 am and 7:00 pm, Tuesdays at 11:30 pm, and on its sister station, WNET, on Saturdays at 7:00 am. Each week's episode can be viewed any time on the Due Process website.

References

External links

1990s American legal television series
1996 American television series debuts
2000s American legal television series
2010s American legal television series
Court shows